Khadjou Sambe (born 1997) is a Senegalese surfer.

Sambe was born in Dakar, Senegal. Her home is located on the island of Ngor, which was featured in the film, The Endless Summer, when surfing was first brought to the island.  Sambe is a member of the Lebou ethnic group that traditionally lives near the sea.

Career 
She is one of three Senegalese members of the World Surf League, and the only woman.  Sambe is training to compete in the Tokyo Olympics  and also serves as a surfing trainer at the Black Girls Surf school for female surfers. She founded a chapter of the surf school in Senegal.

References 

1997 births
Living people
World Surf League surfers
Senegalese sportswomen
Sportspeople from Dakar